The Palais des Festivals et des Congrès (Palace of Festivals and Conferences) is a convention centre in Cannes, France, the venue for the Cannes Film Festival, the Cannes Lions International Festival of Creativity and the NRJ Music Award. The building opened in 1982.

History
The first Palais des Festivals et des Congrès was built in 1949 to host the Cannes Film Festival. The original building was located on the boulevard of Promenade de la Croisette on the present site of the JW Marriott Cannes. That building hosted the 4th and 6th Eurovision Song Contests in 1959 and 1961.

In response to the growing success of the Film Festival and the advent of the first business conventions, such as the MIPTV Media Market since 1965, the City of Cannes decided to build a new Palais in 1979. The new building, a six-story building designed in the Modernist style by the architects Sir Hubert Bennett and François Druet, was constructed on the site of the municipal Casino. It opened in December 1982 and was expanded in 1999 with the construction of the Espace Riviera, a new space of 10,000 square meters.

In January 1992, the Society of Mixed Economy for the Events of the city of Cannes (SEMEC), was created to manage the Palais. SEMEC resulted from the merger of three non-profit organizations: Cannes Tourism, the OMACC and the association Cannes Palais des Festivals et des Congrès.

Today 
The Palais des Festivals is located at the top of blvd. de la Croisette, east of the port. It has an overall space capacity of 35,000 square meters for exhibitions, as well as numerous rooms and 18 auditoriums, the largest of which has a capacity of 2,300. It is the venue for the annual Cannes Film Festival (Festival de Cannes), and possesses "modern and high-tech facilities" for housing conferences throughout the year.

References

Media
Institut National de l'Audiovisuel: Construction of the Palais des festivals (1947) (commentary in French)

External links

 

Buildings and structures in Cannes
Convention centers in France
Cannes Film Festival
Theatres completed in 1949
Tourist attractions in Alpes-Maritimes
Theatres completed in 1982
1949 establishments in France
1982 establishments in France